Strong Township is a township in Chase County, Kansas, United States.  As of the 2020 census, its population was 507.

Geography
The streams of Fox Creek, Indian Creek, Palmer Creek and Prather Creek run through this township.

Communities
The township contains the following settlements:
 City of Strong City.

Cemeteries
The township contains the following cemeteries:
 Saint Anthony.
 Simmons.
 Strong Township.

Further reading

References

External links
 Chase County Website
 City-Data.com
 Chase County maps: Current, Historic, KDOT

Townships in Chase County, Kansas
Townships in Kansas